Lieutenant-General Sir Frederick Stanley Maude KCB CMG DSO (24 June 1864 – 18 November 1917) was a British Army officer. He is known for his operations in the Mesopotamian campaign during the First World War and for conquering Baghdad in 1917.

Early life
Maude was born in Gibraltar, the youngest son of General Sir Frederick Francis Maude, who had been awarded the Victoria Cross in 1855 during the Crimean War, and of Catherine Mary, née Bisshopp, daughter of Very Reverend Sir George Bisshopp, 8th Baronet, Dean of Lismore. The Maude family claimed descent from Eustace de Montaut, who came over to England during the Norman Conquest.

Maude attended St Michael's School, Aldis House, Slough, and Eton College, where he was elected to Pop. After attending a crammer, he entered the Royal Military College, Sandhurst. He graduated in 1883 and was commissioned into the Coldstream Guards in February 1884.

Early service
Maude first saw active service in Egypt from March to September 1885, where he was awarded the Egyptian Medal and the Khedive's Egyptian Star. While attending the Staff College, Camberley from 1895 to 1896, he was promoted to captain on 28 August 1895.

He was promoted again, this time to major, on 5 February 1899, and next saw service during the Second Boer War, where he served from January 1900 to March 1901; and for which he was mentioned in Despatches (10 September 1901), was appointed a Companion of the Distinguished Service Order (DSO) and received the Queen's South Africa Medal.

In May 1901, he was appointed military secretary to the Earl of Minto, Governor-General of Canada, in which capacity he accompanied the Duke and Duchess of Cornwall and York (later King George V and Queen Mary) on their Royal Tour of Canada in September and October 1901. During this trip Maude joined the Duke of York and Lord Minto on a duck hunt at Delta Marsh, Manitoba, and for his services administering the tour he was appointed a Companion of the Order of St Michael and St George (CMG) in October 1901. He served on the staff of the Governor-General until Lord Minto stepped down in 1904, when he returned to Britain to become second-in-command at the Coldstream Guards. He then joined the General Staff, was promoted to lieutenant-colonel in 1907 and colonel in 1911.

First World War

Western Front
In World War I, Maude first served in France. He was a staff officer with III Corps when, in October 1914, he was promoted to brigadier-general and given command of the 14th Brigade, part of the 5th Division. He was wounded in April 1915 and returned home to recover. He returned to France in May and, in June, he was promoted to major-general and transferred to command the 33rd Division, then still in training.

Dardanelles
In mid-August, however, Maude was instead given charge of the 13th Division in Suvla. The 13th suffered heavy casualties retreating from Suvla and landing and later evacuating from Helles before being shifted to Mesopotamia in March 1916. He was the last man evacuated from Suvla Bay.

Mesopotamian Campaign

Maude arrived to catch the end of the British failure at the Siege of Kut where he was promoted to lieutenant-general, replacing General George Gorringe as commander of the newly dubbed Tigris Corps (III Indian Army Corps) in July 1916. Despite being instructed to do no more than hold the existing line, Maude set about to re-organising and re-supplying his mixed British and Indian forces. He was made commander of all Allied forces in Mesopotamia in late July 1916, replacing Sir Percy Lake.

Further advances in Mesopotamia were ordered (18 September 1916) by politicians such as Curzon and Chamberlain and against the wishes of the CIGS Robertson. Liddell Hart later argued that Maude clearly "consciously or unconsciously" ignored his secret orders from Robertson not to attempt to take Baghdad. Robertson changed his mind when it seemed that the Russians might advance to Mosul, removing any Turkish threat to Mesopotamia, and authorised Maude to attack in December 1916.

Given reinforcements and more equipment, Maude directed his force in a steady series of victories. Advancing up the Tigris and winning the battles of Mohammed Abdul Hassan, Hai and Dahra in January 1917, recapturing Kut in February 1917, he took Baghdad on 11 March 1917. (He issued the Proclamation of Baghdad on 19 March.) From Baghdad, he launched the Samarrah Offensive and extended his operations to the Euphrates and Diyala rivers.

Death

After a lull over the summer, in November 1917, whilst his forces were engaged at Ramadi and Tikrit, Maude contracted cholera (which some sources claim to have been caught from drinking unboiled milk) and died in the same house as German field marshal von der Goltz nineteen months earlier. General Marshall succeeded him.
His body was buried in Baghdad (North Gate) War Cemetery. His initial grave and marker was replaced by a more elaborate structure and then enclosed in a small mausoleum structure on the walls of which is mounted the standard Commonwealth War Graves Commission headstone. The epitaph on his CWGC gravestone reads: "'I am the resurrection and the life'. He fought a good fight. He kept the faith." In March 1918 parliament agreed to a request from the King that he grant the sum of £25,000 to his widow.

Memorials

Maude has a memorial stone at Brompton Cemetery in London. An equestrian statue of him was unveiled in December 1923 in Baghdad. The statue was by William Goscombe John and the pedestal by Edward Warren. It was unveiled by Sir Henry Dobbs, the High Commissioner to Iraq, in the presence of King Feisal, Air Marshal Sir John Salmond and many others, including the French and American consuls. The statue was attacked and torn down by an anti-British mob during the Iraqi Republican Revolution of 1958, its subsequent fate is unknown.  

Mount Maude, a peak in the Cascade Range, was named for Frederick Maude by Albert H. Sylvester.

Quotes
 "Our armies do not come into your cities and lands as conquerors or enemies, but as liberators." — Baghdad, March, 1917

References

Bibliography
Liddell Hart, Basil. A History of the World War. Faber & Faber 1930, Cassell 1970, Papermac 1997. .
Woodward, David R (1998). Field Marshal Sir William Robertson. Westport, Connecticut: Praeger Publishers. .

|-

1864 births
1917 deaths
Graduates of the Staff College, Camberley
British Army generals of World War I
British Army personnel of the Second Boer War
Companions of the Distinguished Service Order
Companions of the Order of St Michael and St George
Deaths from cholera
Gibraltarians
Graduates of the Royal Military College, Sandhurst
Grand Officiers of the Légion d'honneur
Knights Commander of the Order of the Bath
Maude family
People educated at Eton College
British military personnel killed in World War I
Burials at Baghdad (North Gate) War Cemetery
British Army major generals